Quadtrine Victavian Hill (born November 18, 1982 in West Palm Beach, Florida) is a former American football fullback. He was originally signed by the Houston Texans as an undrafted free agent in 2006. He played college football at the University of Miami.

High school career
Hill was an All-State tailback at Piper High School in Sunrise, Florida. As a senior in 2001, he rushed for 1,356 yards and 20 touchdowns, averaging more than seven yards per carry.  He was also noted to be an outstanding student with a 4.3 grade-point average.

College career
Hill attended the University of Miami, where he played in 48 games over four seasons from 2002–05, rushing 40 times for 253 yards and catching 56 passes for 414 yards and two touchdowns. He was described as a straight-line runner with excellent speed, and a receiving threat out of the backfield.

Professional career
Hill was originally signed by the Houston Texans as an undrafted free agent on May 4, 2006 but was released six weeks later. He then spent three days with the Chicago Bears in August 2006, and was later signed to the New England Patriots practice squad on January 3, 2007 but was waived the following August.  On August 7, 2007, the Chicago Bears claimed Hill off waivers, but then assigned him "waived/injured" status on August 26, 2007. On September 1, 2007, Hill was placed on the team's injured reserve list. He was waived once again on November 28.

Boxing
Hill has embarked on a boxing career, working with South Florida entrepreneur Kris Lawrence.  Lawrence operates a training program for novice boxers, concentrating specifically on developing athletes culled from other sports such as American football.
Hill won his debut match on February 16, 2010 at Seminole Hard Rock Hotel and Casino, Hollywood, Florida against Vashawn Tomlin by first-round knockout.

Personal life
He is the son of former Los Angeles Rams (1979–80) and Miami Dolphins (1981–84) running back Eddie Hill.

Notes and references

1982 births
Living people
American football fullbacks
New England Patriots players
Chicago Bears players
Houston Texans players
Players of American football from Florida
Piper High School (Florida) alumni
People from Plantation, Florida
Sportspeople from Broward County, Florida